College Heights Secondary is a public high school for grades 8-12 in Prince George, British Columbia part of School District 57 Prince George. In addition to core subjects (e.g. Math, English, Science, Social Studies, French, Physical Education), the school offers a leadership program, a Japanese exchange program, a drama club, debating club, yearly sailing trips to the BC coast, as well as active volleyball, rugby, basketball, hockey, and football teams. Added to this is a series of electives, such as: infotech, dance, home economics, wood shop, drafting, and visual arts, and 4 language courses such as German, French, Japanese, and Spanish. College Heights is also one of the few schools in Prince George to offer an AP (Advanced Placement) English Class. College Heights Secondary School is ranked by The Fraser Institute as the best high school in Prince George in terms of academic performance, and 63rd in British Columbia.

In 2016, College Heights, along with several other High Schools in Prince George were placed on lockdown after they were threatened on Instagram by a group called "Prince George Clowns". The situation was resolved when the two teenagers responsible for the post were arrested on October 6, 2016. Prince George RCMP Cpl. Craig Douglass stated that the police did not believe the threat was credible.

References

High schools in Prince George, British Columbia
Educational institutions in Canada with year of establishment missing